The America East Conference Men's Basketball Player of the Year, known also as the Kevin Roberson America East Conference Men's Basketball Player of the Year, is a basketball award given to the America East Conference's most outstanding player. The award was first given following the 1979–80 season, the first year of the conference's existence (then called ECAC North). Ten players have earned the award multiple times. Only three, however, have been named player of the year three times: Reggie Lewis of Northeastern (1985–1987), Taylor Coppenrath of Vermont (2003–2005), and Jameel Warney of Stony Brook (2014–2016).

The award was named in honor of former winner Kevin Roberson of Vermont after he was killed by a drunk driver in his hometown of Buffalo, New York in May 1993.

Vermont has had the most all-time awards with 15. Former members Northeastern, Stony Brook, and Boston University (which respectively left in 2005, 2022, and 2013) are second with five, while four other schools have at least two awards apiece. In terms of individual winners, Vermont and BU are tied for the lead with five each. There has been one co-player of the year award tie (1979–80). Coincidentally, it was the first year that the award was given.

Key

Winners

Winners by school

Footnotes

References

NCAA Division I men's basketball conference players of the year
Player of the Year